El Parque del Este (In English: "East Park"), renamed as officially Generalissimo Francisco de Miranda Park by Chávez since, in honor of the Venezuelan national hero, is a public recreation park located in the Sucre Municipality of Metropolitan Caracas in Venezuela. The park was designed by Roberto Burle Marx and associates Fernando Tabora and John Stoddart.

The park is located just outside the station Miranda (formerly East Park) Line 1 of the Caracas Metro. East Park is managed and supervised by the National Parks Institute (INPARQUES), an agency under the Ministry of Popular Power for the Environment.

The park combines three differently designed areas: the first is an open grass field with a gentle undulating topography, the second is a densely forested landscape with meandering pathways, while the third is a series of paved gardens with tiled murals and water works.

History

The park is located on part of the land of the ancient hacienda San Jose. (10 ° 29'38 "N - 66 ° 50'8" W) The hacienda still exists and is located between the existing park boundaries and the distributor Santa Cecilia, in front of the Caracas Museum of Transport. 

The area was convenient hacienda San Jose land primarily of old Bucares (Erythrina spp.) on which hung strands of Lagas Palo Beard (Tillandsia usneoides); in addition there were old coffee trees (Coffea arabica).

The park's inauguration took place under the government of President Romulo Betancourt on January 19, 1961 under the May 1960 Decree No. 443  and was designed by Brazilian landscape architect Roberto Burle Marx and associates Fernando Tabora and John Stoddart.

When first opened the park was designed to receive about 6,000 visitors per month.

Official name
El Parque del Este over its history has had the following official names. At the time of its inauguration in 1961 was called Park "Romulo Gallegos" and in 1983 was renamed Park "Romulo Betancourt" a memorial to that character until 2002, when its name changed to present name Park Generalissimo "Francisco Miranda" in honor of the Venezuelan national hero.

Humboldt Planetarium
Humboldt Planetarium started construction on 15 January 1959 under the direction of designer the Venezuelan architect Carlos Ginand Sandoz (1917 - 1963) his inauguration took place on July 24, 1961, its facilities include a 20-meter dome and a Zeiss planetarium projector.

Its mission is to establish the knowledge in astronomy and related sciences, and to make them available for all public. The planetarium wants to promote formal education in all scientific levels.

Zoo

El Parque del Este has a Zoo with a wide variety of animals including Jaguars, Monkeys, Squirrels, Capybaras, which in Venezuela are known as "Chiwire" , Ocelots, Sloths, Opossums, many kinds of birds: Caricare, many types of parrot, yellow-shouldered parrot, Tinamou, White heron, kind egret, Blue heron, gonzalito, blue and yellow macaw, scarlet macaw, Green macaw, North Guacharaca, Barn owls, helmeted curassow, king Zamuro (vulture), Red-billed toucan and reptiles including Crocodiles and Anacondas.

Caravel of Christopher Columbus

For many years one of the attractions of the Parque del Este was the caravel of Columbus, a replica of the ship known as the Nao Santa Maria  was built in the city of Barcelona, Spain, and was purchased by the Corporacion Venezolana Development and brought to the country in 1967. The Chi, children's Foundation donated it to the Parque del Este on 12 October 1971; inside there were allegorical figures of Columbus and the crew that accompanied him on his travels, as well as weapons, shields, flags, clothing, tools, navigational devices and more.

Corvette Leander

The Nao Santa Maria operated until 2008 when by decree of the National Executive President Hugo Chávez was dismantled to make way for a replica of the cruiser Leander and a museum in honor of Francisco de Miranda project which has brought itself a legal dispute.

Considerations aside, the Nao Santa Maria suffered damage caused by years of government neglect, so the replication status at the time of decommissioning was serious. One of the reasons which led to their change by the corvette was the need to implement the rehabilitation plan of the park that had been created to receive about 6,00 people a month, but already was welcoming about 270,000, with consequent damage as a result.

Gallery

References

Further reading
 Anita Berrizbeitia: Roberto Burle-Marx in Caracas. Parque del Este, 1956-1961, University of Pennsylvania Press, Philadelphia, 2004

External links 

  Parque Generalísimo Francisco de Miranda página oficial
 FACEBOOK: Parque del Este - Caracas Venezuela
 FACEBOOK: Parque del Este o Miranda (Antiguo Rómulo Betancourt
 Venezuelatuya.com: parque del Este
 Guía.con.ve: Los planos originales del Parque del Este incluían La Carlota

Videos 
 Parque del Este @ Caracas Venezuela
 Nutria Parque del Este Caracas
 Monos Parque del Este Caracas
 Terrario Parque del Este Caracas
 Documental Planetario Humbold

Geography of Caracas
Este
Tourist attractions in Caracas
Zoos in Caracas